Jacquotte Delahaye (fl. 1656) was a purported pirate of legend in the Caribbean Sea. She has been depicted as operating alongside Anne Dieu-le-Veut as one of very few 17th-century female pirates. There is no evidence from period sources that Delahaye was a real person. Stories of her exploits are attributed to oral storytelling and Leon Treich, a French fiction writer of the 1940s.

Biography
Delahaye reportedly came from Saint-Domingue in modern Haiti, and was the daughter of a French father and a Haitian mother, who spoke French. Her mother is said to have died while giving birth to her brother, who suffered a mild mental disability, and was left in her care after her father's death. According to legend and tradition, she became a pirate after the murder of her father.

Jacquotte was a war hero, and to escape her pursuers she faked her own death and took on a nom de guerre in the form of a male alias, living as a man for many years. Upon her return, she became known as "Back From the Dead Red" because of her striking red hair.

She led a gang of hundreds of pirates, and with their help took over Tortuga, a small Caribbean island off the northwest coast of Hispaniola, in the year of 1656, which was called a "freebooter republic".  Several years later, she died in a shoot-out while defending it.

Historicity 
Primary sources which mention her, her work and happenings, or her life are unknown, nor are there any first-hand accounts. Laura Sook Duncombe wrote: "If Anne de Graaf has only a small chance of having really lived, Jacquotte Delahaye has an even smaller one." The Spanish author Germán Vázquez Chamorro wrote in Mujeres Piratas ('Pirate Women') that she did not exist, but was a literary creation "...added into the lore of the buccaneer period to make the ruthless men more palatable to the modern reader." Stories of her exploits are attributed to oral storytelling and Leon Treich, a French fiction writer of the 1940s.

As Benerson Little summarizes:

In popular culture

 Delahaye's story is the lead subject of Back from The Dead Red, a small independently produced animated film written by Joanna Benecke.
 In the period romantic comedy television series Our Flag Means Death, Leslie Jones appeared as the pirate "Spanish Jackie", who some think was based on Delahaye.

See also
 Charlotte de Berry
 Filibuster
 Privateer

References

Notes

Citations

Bibliography

Further reading
 Apps, Gemma. (May 4, 2021) Jacquotte Delahaye  Sagas of She.  WordPress.

External links
 http://kiba.vox.com/library/post/pirate-quotes.html
 
 Jacquotte Delahaye  video game at Stronghold nation
 Privateer Dragons' Island. Pirate History and Reference Piracy by Dates: Late 1500's - Mid 1700's

Fictional female pirates
Fictional Haitian people
Written fiction presented as fact